The 1958 SCCA National Sports Car Championship season was the eighth season of the Sports Car Club of America's National Sports Car Championship. It began January 12, 1958, and ended October 5, 1958, after sixteen races.

Classes

Schedule

 Feature race

Season results
Feature race overall winners in bold.

 A K Production class was also held, won by George Metzger in a Berkeley.
 A K Production class was also held, won by William Harding in a Berkeley-Excelsior.
 Separate Porsche and MG winners were declared in F Production at Marlboro.
 H Production were classified with G Production at Lime Rock (June).
 D Modified were classified with C Modified at Lime Rock (July).
 H Production were classified with G Production at Lime Rock (July).

Champions

References

External links
World Sports Racing Prototypes: SCCA 1958
Racing Sports Cars: SCCA archive
Etceterini: 1958 program covers

SCCA National Sports Car Championship
Scca National Sports Car Championship
1958 in American motorsport